Simon Moore (born 19 June 1973) is a former English cricketer.  Moore was a right-handed batsman who bowled right-arm fast-medium.  He was born at Harlow, Essex.

Moore represented the Essex Cricket Board in a single List A cricket.  His debut List A match came against the Lancashire Cricket Board in the 2000 NatWest Trophy.  From 2000 to 2001, he represented the Board in 4 List A matches, the last of which came against the Sussex Cricket Board in the 1st round of the 2002 Cheltenham & Gloucester Trophy which was held in 2001.  In his 4 List A matches, he scored 20 runs at a batting average of 10.00, with a high score of 9*.  In the field he took a single catch.  With the ball he took 5 wickets at a bowling average of 25.80, with best figures of 2/25.

References

External links
Simon Moore at Cricinfo
Simon Moore at CricketArchive

1973 births
Living people
Sportspeople from Harlow
English cricketers
Essex Cricket Board cricketers